The lead chamber process was an industrial method used to produce sulfuric acid in large quantities. It has been largely supplanted by the contact process.

In 1746 in Birmingham, England, John Roebuck began producing sulfuric acid in lead-lined chambers, which were stronger and less expensive and could be made much larger than the glass containers that had been used previously. This allowed the effective industrialization of sulfuric acid production, and with several refinements, this process remained the standard method of production for almost two centuries. The process was so robust that as late as 1946, the chamber process still accounted for 25% of sulfuric acid manufactured.

History 
Sulfur dioxide is introduced with steam and nitrogen dioxide into large chambers lined with sheet lead where the gases are sprayed down with water and chamber acid (62–70% sulfuric acid). The sulfur dioxide and nitrogen dioxide dissolve, and over a period of approximately 30 minutes the sulfur dioxide is oxidized to sulfuric acid. The presence of nitrogen dioxide is necessary for the reaction to proceed at a reasonable rate. The process is highly exothermic, and a major consideration of the design of the chambers was to provide a way to dissipate the heat formed in the reactions.

Early plants used very large lead-lined wooden rectangular chambers (Faulding box chambers) that were cooled by ambient air. The internal lead sheathing served to contain the corrosive sulfuric acid and to render the wooden chambers waterproof. Around the turn of the nineteenth century, such plants required about half a cubic meter of volume to process the sulfur dioxide equivalent of a kilogram of burned sulfur.  In the mid-19th century, French chemist Joseph Louis Gay-Lussac redesigned the chambers as stoneware packed masonry cylinders. In the 20th century, plants using Mills-Packard chambers supplanted the earlier designs. These chambers were tall tapered cylinders that were externally cooled by water flowing down the outside surface of the chamber.

Sulfur dioxide for the process was provided by burning elemental sulfur or by the roasting of sulfur-containing metal ores in a stream of air in a furnace. During the early period of manufacture, nitrogen oxides were produced by the decomposition of niter at high temperature in the presence of acid, but this process was gradually supplanted by the air oxidation of ammonia to nitric oxide in the presence of a catalyst. The recovery and reuse of oxides of nitrogen was an important economic consideration in the operation of a chamber process plant.

In the reaction chambers, nitric oxide reacts with oxygen to produce nitrogen dioxide. Liquid from the bottom of the chambers is diluted and pumped to the top of the chamber, and sprayed downward in a fine mist. Sulfur dioxide and nitrogen dioxide are absorbed in the liquid, and react to form sulfuric acid and nitric oxide. The liberated nitric oxide is sparingly soluble in water, and returns to the gas in the chamber where it reacts with oxygen in the air to reform nitrogen dioxide. Some percentage of the nitrogen oxides is sequestered in the reaction liquor as nitrosylsulfuric acid and as nitric acid, so fresh nitric oxide must be added as the process proceeds. Later versions of chamber plants included a high-temperature Glover tower to recover the nitrogen oxides from the chamber liquor, while concentrating the chamber acid to as much as 78% H2SO4. Exhaust gases from the chambers are scrubbed by passing them into a tower, through which some of the Glover acid flows over broken tile. Nitrogen oxides are absorbed to form nitrosylsulfuric acid, which is then returned to the Glover tower to reclaim the oxides of nitrogen.

Sulfuric acid produced in the reaction chambers is limited to about 35% concentration. At higher concentrations, nitrosylsulfuric acid precipitates upon the lead walls in the form of 'chamber crystals', and is no longer able to catalyze the oxidation reactions.

Chemistry 
Sulfur dioxide is generated by burning elemental sulfur or by roasting pyritic ore in a current of air:

S8 + 8 O2 → 8 SO2 
4 FeS2 + 11 O2 → 2 Fe2O3 + 8 SO2

Nitrogen oxides are produced by decomposition of niter in the presence of sulfuric acid, or by hydrolysis of nitrosylsulfuric acid:

2 NaNO3 + H2SO4 → Na2SO4 + H2O + NO + NO2 + O2
2 NOHSO4 + H2O →  2 H2SO4 + NO + NO2

In the reaction chambers, sulfur dioxide and nitrogen dioxide dissolve in the reaction liquor. Nitrogen dioxide is hydrated to produce nitrous acid, which then oxidizes the sulfur dioxide to sulfuric acid and nitric oxide. The reactions are not well characterized, but it is known that nitrosylsulfuric acid is an intermediate in at least one pathway. The major overall reactions are:

2 NO2 + H2O → HNO2 + HNO3
SO2 (aq) + HNO3 → NOHSO4
NOHSO4 + HNO2 →  H2SO4 + NO2 + NO
SO2 (aq) + 2 HNO2 → H2SO4 + 2 NO

Nitric oxide escapes from the reaction liquor and is subsequently reoxidized by molecular oxygen to nitrogen dioxide.  This is the overall rate determining step in the process:

2 NO + O2 → 2 NO2

Nitrogen oxides are absorbed and regenerated in the process, and thus serve as a catalyst for the overall reaction:

2 SO2 + 2 H2O + O2 → 2 H2SO4

References

Further reading

External links
 Process flow sheet of sulphuric acid manufacturing by lead chamber process

Industrial processes
Lead
Sulfur
Catalysis